There are at least four named lakes and reservoirs in Madison County, Arkansas.

Lakes
	Dills Lakes, el.

Reservoirs
	Beaver Lake, el.  
	City of Huntsville Lake, el.  
	Hindsville Lake, el.

See also

 List of lakes in Arkansas

Notes

Bodies of water of Madison County, Arkansas
Madison